Szreniawa may refer to:
Szreniawa coat of arms
Szreniawa, Greater Poland Voivodeship (west-central Poland)
Szreniawa, Miechów County in Lesser Poland Voivodeship (south Poland)
Szreniawa, Proszowice County in Lesser Poland Voivodeship (south Poland)
Szreniawa, Lubusz Voivodeship (west Poland)